Accara elegans is the sole species of the monotypic genus Accara in the botanical family Myrtaceae.  It is a shrub endemic to the State of Minas Gerais in Brazil, reaching 1-2m in height.

Formerly included in the genera Myrtus and Psidium, Accara differs from the latter in embryo structure, and from the former in being pentamerous (having its parts in fives) and in bud structure.  The generic name is an anagram of the type location, Caraça, and is similar to the presumably closely related genus of Acca, nowadays sometimes included in Feijoa.

References

Endemic flora of Brazil
Monotypic Myrtaceae genera
Myrtaceae